Knowles McGill (born 21 February 1942) is a Canadian former biathlete who competed in the 1968 Winter Olympics.

References

1942 births
Living people
Canadian male biathletes
Olympic biathletes of Canada
Biathletes at the 1968 Winter Olympics